Sternotomis ducalis is a species of beetle belonging to the family Cerambycidae.

Description
Head and pronotum are mainly black, while the surface of the elytra varies from yellowish-greenish to reddish. Femora and tibiae are usually black. Antennae are black and longer than the insect.

Distribution
This species can be found in Gambia, São Tomé and Príncipe, Senegal.

References
 Biolib
 F. VITALI - Cerambycoidea
 Sternotomis ducalis in Coleop-terra

Sternotomini
Beetles described in 1835